Wing Commander Charlotte Joanne Thompson-Edgar  is a British nurse. She served as the United Kingdom's Officer Commanding Medical Emergency Response Teams in Afghanistan and in 2015, while holding the rank of Squadron Leader, was awarded an Associate of the Royal Red Cross (ARRC) for her services to the Princess Mary's Royal Air Force Nursing Service.

After giving emergency treatment on the battlefield to Mark Ormrod, Britain's first triple amputee in the war in Afghanistan, she argued for and was given permission to develop specialist clinical training for such extreme cases.

Thompson-Edgar was featured in BBC coverage of the 2016 Royal British Legion Festival of Remembrance.

References

External links 

 Text of a speech by Thompson-Edgar, given to the Harpur Trust in April 2016

Year of birth missing
Place of birth missing
British nurses
Princess Mary's Royal Air Force Nursing Service officers
Associate Members of the Royal Red Cross
People from Bedford